"I Don't Believe in You" is a song by English band Talk Talk, released by Parlophone in 1986 as the fourth and final single from their third studio album The Colour of Spring. The song was written by Mark Hollis and Tim Friese-Greene, and produced by Friese-Greene. "I Don't Believe in You" peaked at number 96 in the UK Singles Chart.

Release
The B-side, "Does Caroline Know", was recorded live at the Montreux Jazz Festival in the summer of 1986. The original studio version of the track was featured on Talk Talk's 1984 album It's My Life.

Critical reception
Upon its release as a single, Andy Strickland of Record Mirror described the song as "yet another measured piece of acoustic, heart-rending pop from the most subtle of the British pop giants". He noted the melody "will sound familiar" and added that the dangerously Dire Straits-ish guitar solo means it's a cut below, say, 'Life's What You Make It'". Max Bell of Number One commented, "Talk Talk fans may disagree but when I hear Hollis's brooding adenoidal dramas I feel like giving him a handkerchief. The band's textures are as haunting as ever and I don't mind the old fashioned echoes of Procol Harum and Traffic. I just wish he'd blow his nose." Music & Media selected it as one of their "records of the week" in their 22 November 1986 issue and described the song as "bluesy".

Track listing
7–inch single (UK, Europe and Canada)
"I Don't Believe in You" – 5:02
"Does Caroline Know" (Live version) – 8:09

12–inch single (UK and Europe)
"I Don't Believe in You" – 5:02
"Does Caroline Know" (Live version) – 8:09
"Happiness Is Easy" (12" mix) – 7:02

Personnel
Credits are adapted from The Colour of Spring CD liner notes and the 12-inch single sleeve notes.

"I Don't Believe in You"
 Mark Hollis – vocals
 Paul Webb – bass
 Lee Harris – drums
 Robbie McIntosh – guitar
 Tim Friese-Greene – piano
 Steve Winwood – organ
 Gaynor Sadler – harp
 Morris Pert – percussion
 David Roach – soprano saxophone
 Ian Curnow – instrumental

"Does Caroline Know"
 Mark Hollis – vocals
 Paul Webb – bass
 Lee Harris – drums
 John Turnbull – guitar
 Rupert Black, Ian Curnow – keyboards
 Phil Reis, Leroy Williams – percussion

Production
 Tim Friese-Greene – producer ("I Don't Believe in You", "Happiness Is Easy"), mixing ("Does Caroline Know")
 Paul Webb, Lee Harris – mixing ("Happiness Is Easy")

Other
 James Marsh – illustration

Charts

References

1986 songs
1986 singles
Parlophone singles
Talk Talk songs
Songs written by Mark Hollis (musician)
Songs written by Tim Friese-Greene
Song recordings produced by Tim Friese-Greene